The canyon canastero (Asthenes pudibunda) is a species of bird in the family Furnariidae. It is found in Chile and Peru. Its natural habitats are subtropical or tropical moist montane forest and subtropical or tropical high-altitude shrubland. Three subspecies are recognized:
Asthenes pudibunda neglecta (Cory, 1916) - Peru
Asthenes pudibunda pudibunda (Sclater, 1874) - Peru
Asthenes pudibunda grisior Koepcke, M., 1961 - Peru and Chile

References

canyon canastero
Birds of the Peruvian Andes
canyon canastero
canyon canastero
Taxonomy articles created by Polbot